The 2018 Stockport Metropolitan Borough Council election took place on 3 May 2018 to elect members of Stockport Metropolitan Borough Council in England. This was on the same day as other local elections. Stockport Council is elected in thirds, which means that in each three member local ward, one councillor is elected every year, except every four years which is classed as a fallow year. The last fallow year was 2017, when no local government elections took place in the borough. Those councillors elected in 2018 will serve a four-year term, expiring in 2022. The election in Edgeley & Cheadle Heath was deferred, owing to the death of the Conservative candidate, until 24 May 2018.

After the election, the Labour minority administration that had governed since 2016 was able to continue in office, although without a majority the administrations budget was voted down in March 2019, the first time this had happened since the 1980s.

Election results by ward  
Asterix indicates incumbent in the Ward, and Bold names highlight winning candidate.

Bramhall North

Bramhall South

Bredbury and Woodley

Bredbury Green and Romiley

Brinnington and Central

Cheadle and Gatley

Cheadle Hulme North

Cheadle Hulme South

Davenport and Cale Green

Hazel Grove

Heald Green

Heatons North

Heatons South

Manor

Marple North

Marple South

Offerton

Reddish North

Reddish South

Stepping Hill

Deferred election

Edgeley and Cheadle Heath
On 17 April 2018, Stockport Council published a notice to confirm that due to the death of the Conservative candidate Maureen Baldwin-Moore the scheduled election for this ward would no longer take place on 3 May 2018, and that a new poll would take place on 24 May 2018. Under the Electoral Administration Act, the Conservatives were allowed to select a replacement candidate, but new nominations by other parties were not permitted.

References

2018 English local elections
2018
2010s in Greater Manchester